"Everyday" is a ballad song by Phil Collins released as the second single of his fifth studio album, Both Sides. It was also released as the seventh track on the 2004 compilation album, Love Songs: A Compilation... Old and New. The single achieved success mostly in North America in the spring of 1994.

Release
Due to the disappointing US performance of the first single of the album, "Both Sides of the Story", which only peaked at number 25 on the Billboard Hot 100, Collins' record label urged the release of the second single. The decision proved right as the single peaked one place higher than "Both Sides", at number 24 on the Billboard Hot 100. However, in Collins' native UK, "Everyday" performed worse than the previous single (which made the top 10), peaking at number 15.

In Canada, where Collins had been experiencing greater chart success than in both the US and the UK since ...But Seriously, "Everyday" reached number eight on the RPM Top Singles chart and peaked atop the Adult Contemporary chart on 18 April 1994, spending 10 week in the top three on the latter chart. It ended 1994 as Canada's fifty-ninth-most successful single and fourth-most successful adult contemporary song.

The song was only performed live during Phil's 1994 concerts.

Music video
The song's music video, directed by Jim Yukich, features Collins moving out of a luxury apartment he (presumably) shared with the person he's addressing in the song. Inside the apartment all of the items are covered and ready for the movers, and the walls are bare white. Collins' record label did not promote the single heavily, resulting in the video receiving minimal airplay on MTV and VH1, just as same as his previous single, "Both Sides of the Story."

Track listing
UK 3-track CD single
"Everyday"
"Don't Call Me Ashley"
"Everyday" (early demo version)

Europe 4-track CD single
"Everyday"
"Don't Call Me Ashley"
"Everyday" (early demo version)
"Doesn't Anybody Stay Together Anymore" (live)

Personnel 
 Phil Collins – lead and backing vocals, keyboards, guitar, bass, drums, percussion

Charts

Weekly charts

Year-end charts

References

1990s ballads
1993 songs
1994 singles
Atlantic Records singles
Phil Collins songs
Pop ballads
Song recordings produced by Phil Collins
Songs written by Phil Collins
Virgin Records singles
Warner Music Group singles